Sabana de la Mar National Airport  was a small airfield serving Sabana de la Mar, Hato Mayor, northeast Dominican Republic, and was only used for emergency landings and private flights.

References 

Airports in the Dominican Republic
Buildings and structures in Hato Mayor Province